The Premio 40 Principales for Best Spanish New Artist is an honor presented annually at Los Premios 40 Principales, the annual awards organised by Spain's top music radio Los 40 Principales.

References

Los Premios 40 Principales
Spanish music awards
Awards established in 2006
Music awards for breakthrough artist